Randam Bhavam is a 2001 Indian Malayalam-language crime drama film directed by Lal Jose and written by Ranjan Pramod. It stars Suresh Gopi in dual role along with Thilakan, Biju Menon, Poornima Mohan, Lena, Narendra Prasad, Lal and Srividya in pivotal roles.

Plot

The film begins with Police Officer Jeevan (Biju Menon) taking charge of Mangalore city Police. He learns from his subordinate Sudhakaran Nair (Sadiq) that the city is still ruled by underworld don Govindji (Thilakan). Navaneeth Krishnan a.k.a. Kishanji (Suresh Gopi) is Govindji's lead henchman. Govindji acts as a sort of Godfather to him. Kishan has a face-off with Jeevan and Jeevan gets injured in the fight. Jeevan later is surprised to see Kishan during a train journey but it turns out that it is Ananthakrishnan a.k.a. Ananthu (Suresh Gopi), Kishan's identical twin, who, unlike Kishan, is a well-educated and righteous person. Jeevan visits their family home in Kerala to confirm the facts. He learns that Kishan, despite being from a well-off family and being topper at school, ran off during his teenage and joined the gangs of Mangalore owing to a punishing father (Narendra Prasad). Jeevan also meets Kishen's uncle (Nedumudi Venu) and his daughter Manikkutty (Lena) who is Ananthu's fiancée.

Back in Mangalore, Jeevan meets Govindji and he introduce Jeevan to his lawyer (Oduvil Unnikrishnan) as the officer responsible for destroying Pune underworld and as the son of former Deputy General of Police, Chandrasekhar. Later in the film, it is hinted that Govindji is responsible for the death of Jeevan's father and Jeevan is seeking revenge. Kishen's best friend Muhammed Ibrahim (Lal) works for Mahendra Reddy (T. P. Madhavan), the leader of the rival gang. Despite this, they keep their friendship alive.

Kishen lives in a flat provided by Govindji and has a deep relation with neighbouring family of Akhila (Poornima Indrajith) and her mother (Sukumari), whom he calls Mummy. Akhila is in love with Kishen but he wears a stern face to hide his love. Ananthu visits Kishen at his flat and befriends Akhila. Kishen becomes visibly jealous with the affection and respect that Akhila shows to Ananthu. Ananthu requests Kishen to return home, however Kishen refuses as he still strongly hates his father.  Kishen murders Mehaboob (Nadirshah), a close associate of Muhammed Ibrahim which upsets him greatly. Jeevan councils Muhammed and he provides information on Reddy's secret godowns. Jeevan raids the godowns and arrests Reddy. Govindji senses danger and he convinces Kishen to kill Muhammed Ibrahim which he does with a single shot from behind with great grief. Back home Kishen finds 'Mummy' murdered and realize that Govindji ordered the murder. Kishen visits Govindji and gets furious with him. He kills the man who has murdered Mummy and quits the gang. In respite Govindji arranges a 'Shoot at sight' order against Kishen. Jeevan learns this and tries to protect Kishen. Meanwhile, Ananthu arrives in Mangalore to pursue Kishen to attend their sister's wedding. Jeevan manages to find Kishen but Ananthu is killed in front of them by Govindji's men. Jeevan and Akhila convinces Kishen to pretend as Ananthu so as to escape Govindji. Kishen, Jeevan and Akhila takes Ananthu's body back to Kerala. At home, he finds his parents grieving on his death. After the funeral, Jeevan returns while Akhila stays for a few more days. Kishen tries to be Ananthu, without knowing anything about him. He find it very difficult and goes lonely most of the times. He enters a long leave from college. He understands how much his father loved him. Also his mother (Sreevidya) reveals to him that she had understood his identity at first sight.

Back in Mangalore Govindji finds a new hitman (Baburaj) and kills Mahendra Reddy to destroy evidence against him. Jeevan visits Kishen and request his assistance to destroy Govindji. He tries to provoke Kishen to seek revenge for his brother's death. However Kishen refuses to help as he is trying to carry on his new life. Ananthu gets honoured by a national award for his contributions to bird watching and book. Kishen finds it difficult to face the press interviews following the award. He reveals the truth to his uncle (Nedumudi Venu). Meanwhile, Govindji reads about the award and learns that Kishen has a twin brother. He get alerted immediately and visits Kishen's house pretending to give a compensation to the family for his former employee. Kishen handles the situation well, but Govindji's doubt remains. Govindji abducts Akhila and tracks that Kishen is the one who is alive and tries to get Kishen come back to Mangalore. Finally Kishen decides to go and his father also learns the truth. He arrives in Mangalore and takes hand in hand with Jeevan. They capture all of Govindji's men in a single night and raids all of his hideouts. Kishen come to Govindji's bungalow and rescues Akhila. Govindji stands alone helplessly. Kishen tells Govindji that he is defeated, but he does not want to kill him. He hands his gun to Govindji. But instead of killing Kishen, Govindji commits suicide.

Cast

 Suresh Gopi as Navneeth Krishnan "Kichu" a.k.a. Kishanji & Anantha Krishnan "Ananthu". (Double Role)
 Thilakan as Govindji, a Mafia Don 
 Biju Menon as Jeevan Commissioner of Police Mangalore City
 Lal as Muhammed Ibrahim
 Poornima Mohan as Akhila, Kichu's Love Interest.
 Lena as Manikutty, Ananthu's Fiancée.
 Nedumudi Venu as Kuruppu, Kichu's and Ananthu's Uncle, Manikutty's Father
 Narendra Prasad as Haridas, Kichu's and Ananthu's Father
 Srividya as Kichu's and Ananthu's Mother
 Janardhanan as Sathyaprathapan, D. I. G. of Police 
 Oduvil Unnikrishnan as Advocate Potty, Govindji's Lawyer
 Sukumari as Akhila's Mother
 Bala Singh as Mahendra Reddy, a Mafia Don and rival of Govindji
 Sadiq as S. I. Sudhakaran Nair
 Augustine as Pushpangadan
 Nadirshah as Mehaboob 
 Baburaj as Shetty
 Master Sumith Rajan/Rejith Rajan as Suresh Gopi's childhood double role
 Nandhu Pothuval as Subhramanyan,a gangster working for Mahendra Reddy
 Kaviraj as Muttaiah, a gangster working for Govindji

Actor Motta Rajendran appears as a gangster working for Mahendra Reddy.

Soundtrack

The music and background score for the film was composed by Vidyasagar, with lyrics penned by Gireesh Puthenchery.

Reception
The film had a lukewarm reception at the box-office, although the songs were well received. The song 'Marannittumenthino' is still very popular among Keralites. However, the film had a surge in popularity since it has been released on DVD and when it was started airing on television. Many consider this to be one of the best action-drama films of the decade acclaiming performance of Suresh Gopi and Thilakan. The direction of Lal Jose was also praised.

References

External links
 

2000s Malayalam-language films
2001 films
Indian crime drama films
Indian gangster films
Films about organised crime in India
Fictional portrayals of the Karnataka Police
Films scored by Vidyasagar
Films set in Karnataka
Films shot in Karnataka
Films shot in Mangalore
Films directed by Lal Jose